The 1884 United States presidential election in Oregon took place on November 4, 1884. All contemporary 38 states were part of the 1884 United States presidential election. Voters chose three electors to the Electoral College, which selected the president and vice president.

Oregon was won by Secretary of State James G. Blaine (R-Maine), running with Senator John A. Logan, with 50.99% of the vote, against Grover Cleveland, the 28th governor of New York, (D–New York), running with the former governor of Indiana Thomas A. Hendricks, with 46.70% of the popular vote. Blaine won the state by a narrow margin of 4.29%.

The Greenback and Anti-Monopoly Parties both chose major general and former governor of Massachusetts Benjamin Butler and Absolom M. West, an unseated Mississippi representative, received 1.38% of the popular vote.

The Prohibition party chose the 8th Governor of Kansas, John St. John and Maryland State Representative William Daniel, received 0.93% of the popular vote.

Results

Results by county

See also
 United States presidential elections in Oregon

References

Oregon
1884
1884 Oregon elections